Eleanor Gates (26 September 1874 – 7 March 1951) was an American playwright who created seven plays that were staged on Broadway. Her best known work was the play The Poor Little Rich Girl, which was produced by her husband in 1913 and went on to be made as films for Mary Pickford in 1917 and for Shirley Temple in 1936.

Biography
Eleanor Gates was born on 26 September 1874 in Shakopee, Minnesota, southwest of Minneapolis. While she was an infant her family moved to the Jim River Valley of South Dakota where they ran a cattle ranch. She later described her early life in her novel The Biography of a Prairie Girl. 

Gates married another playwright, Richard Walton Tully, in 1901 after they had both completed their studies at the University of California, in Berkeley.  Gates had worked initially as a writer for a newspaper in San Francisco, as well as writing novels. In 1907, one of her novels was illustrated by Arthur Rackham. Her best known work was the play The Poor Little Rich Girl, which was produced by her husband in 1913. Tully divorced her in 1914 citing desertion, which Gates admitted.

Before Gates's divorce had been finalized, she married another divorcé, the novelist Frederick Ferdinand Moore, in Paterson, New Jersey, in October 1914. In 1916 she annulled the marriage they both realized that they were not legally married. At the time they both said they intended to remarry when it could be arranged. Moore later created Book Dealers' Weekly (1925).

At the beginning of 1915, Gates founded the Liberty Feature Film Company, which was said by Motion Picture News to be the only film company to be owned and managed by women. The company was led by the wife of an Alaskan businessman, Sadir Lindblom. In the year that it existed, the company created several two reel films.

The first film, produced in 1917, was The Poor Little Rich Girl, which starred Mary Pickford. Shirley Temple starred in the 1936 remake of the same name. The film story, created to cash in on the talents of the eight-year-old Temple and the rights to the "changing places" story, was obtained for $40,000 to Gates and an additional $20,000 to Mary Pickford's company which had made the 1917 film. The new film had made two million dollars by the end of 1939.

Gates was struck down near her home by an automobile and died on 7 March 1951 in Los Angeles County General Hospital.

Works
The Biography of a Prairie Girl, 1902
The Plow-Woman, 1906, adapted for 1917 film
Good-night: (Buenas Noches), 1907 - illustrated by Arthur Rackham
The Poor Little Rich Girl (play in three acts), 1912
Doc - 1914 film
Swat the Fly, 1915
Apron-Strings, 1917
Piggie, 1919
Cupid the Cowpuncher, 1920 film based on her story
The Rich Little Poor Boy, 1922
Once to Every Man, 1934 film - written with George Waggner

References

External links

 
 
 
 

1874 births
1951 deaths
People from Shakopee, Minnesota
Writers from Los Angeles
University of California, Berkeley alumni
Stanford University alumni
Writers from Minnesota
Writers from New York (state)
American women dramatists and playwrights